Karasburg Airport  is an airport serving the town of Karasburg in ǁKaras Region, Namibia.

See also

List of airports in Namibia
Transport in Namibia

References

External links
 OurAirport - Karasburg
 OpenStreetMap - Karasburg

Airports in Namibia